Prone Mortal Form is the first album by American metal band Only Living Witness. It was released on May 21, 1993 on CD and audio cassette. A European digipak was also released, which added a cover song of Hüsker Dü and three bonus tracks (from the Complex Man 7" single). Blabbermouth.net described it as combining influences from hardcore punk, the Seattle sound, and early Helmet.

CD version 
Track listing

European digipak bonus tracks
Track listing

Audio cassette version

References 

1993 debut albums